Susanna Reid (born 10 December 1970) is an English television presenter and journalist. She was a co-presenter of BBC Breakfast from 2003 until 2014 alongside Bill Turnbull and Charlie Stayt. In 2013, she finished as a runner-up on the eleventh series of Strictly Come Dancing. Since 2014, Reid has been the lead presenter of the ITV Breakfast programme Good Morning Britain alongside Ben Shephard, Kate Garraway and formerly Piers Morgan. She also presented Sunday Morning Live on BBC One from 2010 to 2011.

Early life and education
The youngest of three children, Reid was born in Croydon, South London. She was educated at the independent Croham Hurst School, from 1975 to 1981, followed by the independent Croydon High School (1981–87) and St Paul's Girls' School (1987–89) in London. Her parents separated and divorced when she was aged 9. Her father was a management consultant, her mother was a nurse. Reid appeared as an actress while an adolescent, in a stage production of Agatha Christie's Spider's Web (1982) with Shirley Anne Field, and then alongside Peter Barkworth and Harriet Walter in The Price (1985) on Channel 4.

Reid studied Politics and Philosophy at the University of Bristol (1989–92), where she was editor of Epigram, the student newspaper, and then trained as a journalist at Cardiff University's Centre for Journalism, earning a Postgraduate Diploma in Broadcast Journalism.

Career
Reid began her career as a news producer at BBC Radio Bristol in 1994, and become a producer for Radio 5 Live in 1996. She later joined BBC News 24, where she spent two years as a reporter. When the 23:00 presenter did not arrive one night, Reid became a stand-in presenter for an hour (while three months pregnant with her first child), which turned into a permanent position.

Reid was one of the main presenters on BBC Breakfast, presenting with Bill Turnbull on Mondays, Tuesdays and Wednesdays and previously presenting with Charlie Stayt on Fridays, Saturdays and Sundays. She held that role from 2012, when she replaced lead presenter Sian Williams. In 2010, Reid stepped down from presenting Breakfast on Saturdays and Sundays to take a role on a new programme Sunday Morning Live. As of the final episode of the first series on 21 November 2010, she resumed her weekend presenting duties on BBC Breakfast within 2 weeks.

Reid was also previously the regular newsreader during the headlines on The Andrew Marr Show. On 16 May 2010, she stood in briefly for Andrew Marr for the Sunday newspaper review, when he arrived late for the programme after interviewing the new Prime Minister David Cameron. Reid handed back to Marr following the paper review. Reid presented the main show for the first time on 10 March 2013 following Marr's extended absence after suffering a stroke in January 2013. On 22 February 2009, Reid presented the BBC's live coverage of the 2009 Oscars from Los Angeles and also presented coverage of the 2010 Oscars on 7 March.

In 2013, Reid took part in Strictly Come Dancing (series 11). Her professional dance partner was Kevin Clifton. The couple finished as one of the joint runners-up.

On 31 December 2013, Reid presented the New Year Live programme on BBC One.

In February 2014, it was reported that ITV were attempting to recruit Reid for their new breakfast programme, with a £1 million salary. Reid had previously rejected claims of moving to ITV in December 2013, during her Strictly Come Dancing stint, saying she would "bleed BBC" if cut open. On 3 March 2014, the BBC confirmed Reid's move to ITV to front rival breakfast programme Good Morning Britain, which replaced its former breakfast show Daybreak. She co-hosts the show alongside rotating male presenters Monday-Wednesday and with Ben Shephard every Thursday. She hosts the show from 6 am to 9 am.

On 19 December 2014, Reid appeared on a special Text Santa episode of Tipping Point with fellow Good Morning Britain presenters. In 2017, Reid co-presented Save Money: Good Food alongside Matt Tebbutt.

In October 2018, Reid appeared as a cameo in Hollyoaks.

In July 2020, Reid appeared on Celebrity Gogglebox alongside barrister and TV judge Robert Rinder.

On 3 May 2022, Reid interviewed Prime Minister Boris Johnson live on Good Morning Britain.

Awards
In March 2014, the Television and Radio Industries Club named Reid Newsreader of the Year at their annual awards, the week after it was announced she would join ITV. In 2015, she again won the same award. In 2015, she also received an Honorary Fellowship from her alma mater, Cardiff University.

Personal life
Reid separated from partner, former sports correspondent Dominic Cotton in 2014 after 16 years together. Reid lives in South London with her three children. Reid is a supporter of Crystal Palace, visiting the club's Selhurst Park ground with her dance partner while taking part in Strictly Come Dancing, in 2013. In November 2018, Reid revealed that she was in a relationship with Crystal Palace chairman Steve Parish. However it was announced in April 2019 that the relationship had ended.

Reid is a pescetarian, something she used to discuss occasionally with chef James Martin when commenting on the dishes on Saturday Kitchen. In 2015, she said she suffers "very mild tinnitus".

Charity work
Reid is a regular contributor to Media Trust, a charity linking other charities to the media industry, and has hosted events for the Myotubular Trust and Voluntary Arts England. In 1998, just before she became a reporter for Breakfast News, she worked for three months in Sri Lanka as a voluntary media consultant for a charity which counsels victims of the civil war and operates orphanages and social development programmes.

On 22 April 2012, Reid took part in the London Marathon, raising money for Sport Relief, completing the course in just over five hours.

Filmography

Television

Film

Honours

Scholastic
 Chancellor, visitor, governor, rector and fellowships

References

External links

Living people
Alumni of Cardiff University
Alumni of the University of Bristol
BBC newsreaders and journalists
English television presenters
ITV Breakfast presenters and reporters
People educated at Croham Hurst School
People educated at Croydon High School
People from Croydon
1970 births
BBC radio producers